The Farmer's and Merchant's Bank Building, also known as the Garber Bank, is a historic building in Red Cloud, Nebraska. It was built in 1888-1889 by Seward Garber and John W. Moon. The bank's founding president was Silas Garber. Author Willa Cather took inspiration from the Garber family to write about Captain and Mrs Forrester in her 1923 novel, A Lost Lady. She also used the building as inspiration in her 1935 novel, Lucy Gayheart. It was designed in the Renaissance Revival architectural style. It has been listed on the National Register of Historic Places since March 5, 1981.

References

External links

Bank buildings on the National Register of Historic Places in Nebraska
National Register of Historic Places in Webster County, Nebraska
Renaissance Revival architecture in Nebraska
Commercial buildings completed in 1883